Minni Katharina Nurme (born 30 October 1917 in Aidu Parish, today Viljandi Parish, Viljandi County; died 22 November 1994 in Tallinn) was an Estonian writer.

Life and career
Born Minni Neumann, Nurme graduated from the girls' school in Viljandi in 1936.  During World War II she lived behind Soviet lines; after the war she moved to Tallinn and worked as a freelance writer.  Her first prose work was the 1939 novel Kentaurid (The Centaurs). Two years later came the novel Ratastool (The Wheelchair).  She turned more and more to poetry during the war, and in 1945 published her first poetry collection, Sünnimuld (Mother Earth). Between her second and third collections came a ten-year hiatus, largely due to the harassment of Stalinist authorities.  Nurme was also active as a translator, from Finnish and English.

Nurme's elder sister was the poet Salme Ekbaum. After she married Jan Raudsepp in 1936, she was known until 1941 as Minni Raudsepp. In 1941 she married the writer Aadu Hint; the marriage was dissolved in 1958, but produced five children, three sons and two daughters. The divorce was a scandal in Estonia. Of these one, Eeva Park, later became a well-known writer.

Eeva Park's 1993 novel Tolm ja Tuul describes the breakup of her parents' marriage.

Works

Prose
Kentaurid (novel, 1939)
Ratastool (novel, 1941)
Lämbumine (stories, 1946)
Valus küsimus (short prose, 1962)
Rähni laastud (short stories, 1966)

Poetry collection
Sünnimuld (1945)
Pikalt teelt (1947)
Juured Mullas (1957)
Maarjahein (selection, 1967)
Sookailudes on loitsud (1971)
Kuuvein (1974)
Tuules lendlev seeme (1976)
Pilvede pisarad tärkamisse (selection, 1978)
Päevapuri (1981)
Valgevalul (1983)
Puud varjulised (selection, 1987)

References

This article is based on a translation of the corresponding article on the German Wikipedia.

1917 births
1994 deaths
People from Viljandi Parish
Estonian women novelists
Estonian women short story writers
Estonian women poets
Estonian translators
20th-century Estonian women writers
20th-century Estonian novelists
20th-century Estonian poets
20th-century translators
Translators to Estonian
Translators from Finnish
Translators from English
Soviet writers